The 1931 World Table Tennis Championships women's doubles was the fourth edition of the women's doubles championship.
Mária Mednyánszky and Anna Sipos defeated Magda Gál and Lili Tiszai in the final by three sets to one.

Results

See also
List of World Table Tennis Championships medalists

References

-
-